Gakiyeh or Gakeyeh, also rendered as Gakia, may refer to:
 Gakiyeh, Dorudfaraman
 Gakiyeh, Miyan Darband